T-SPOT.TB is a type of ELISpot assay used for tuberculosis diagnosis, which belongs to the group of interferon gamma release assays. The test is manufactured by Oxford Immunotec in the UK. It is available in most European countries, the United States as well as various other countries. It was developed by researchers at the University of Oxford in England.

Test overview 
T-SPOT.TB counts the number of antimycobacterial effector T cells, white blood cells that produce interferon-gamma, in a sample of blood.  This gives an overall measurement of the host immune response against mycobacteria, which can reveal the presence of infection with Mycobacterium tuberculosis, the causative agent of tuberculosis (TB). Because this does not rely on production of a reliable antibody response or recoverable pathogen, the technique can be used to detect latent tuberculosis. This technique has the advantage that it is comparatively fast (results within 24 hours), and less influenced by previous BCG vaccination compared with the traditional testing method for latent tuberculosis, the tuberculin skin test. This is due to the fact that both tests use different antigens for stimulation. While the tuberculin skin test uses purified protein derivative, a heterogeneous mixture of more than two hundred different mycobacterial peptides, the T-SPOT.TB uses relatively Mycobacterium tuberculosis-specific antigens (peptides called ESAT-6 and CFP-10). ESAT-6 and CFP-10 are expressed by Mycobacterium tuberculosis, but are absent from all currently used BCG vaccines and most nontuberculous mycobacteria. Based on those test principles, it is thought that the T-SPOT.TB is more specific than the tuberculin skin test.

Test performance 
In one study in Germany, 70 out of 72 patients with confirmed TB infection were T-SPOT.TB positive, indicating a sensitivity of 97.2%. However, more recent data from a study in children with active TB disease in the UK suggest that the sensitivity of the T-SPOT.TB may in fact be worse than that of the tuberculin skin test (sensitivity reported as 66% and 82%, respectively). The performance of interferon-gamma release assays in children has also been questioned by other publications. A metaanalysis of studies in children with active tuberculosis published in 2011 suggests that the sensitivity of the T-SPOT.TB is very similar to that of the tuberculin skin test (pooled sensitivity reported as 84% and 80%, respectively).

References

External links
 T-SPOT.TB blood test for tuberculosis
 Oxford Immunotec Ltd.

Tuberculosis